HD 153791 is a double star in the southern constellation of Ara. The primary is a sixth magnitude A-type main sequence star. It has a magnitude 12.3 companion at an angular separation of 6.0″ along a position angle of 249°, as of 1999.

References

External links
 HR 6323
 CCDM J17037-4710
 Image HD 153791

Ara (constellation)
153791
Double stars
A-type main-sequence stars
6323
083481
Durchmusterung objects